“Lose It” is a song by Britpop band Supergrass. It was released as a single from their debut album I Should Coco. Officially, it is the third single taken from the album. However, it was a vinyl only release in the United States on Sub Pop Records. Only 2,500 copies were originally pressed throughout 1995, therefore making it somewhat of a rarity, but it is believed more copies have been pressed in the following years. 

On the strength of imports, it managed to reach #75 in the singles chart in the United Kingdom during 1995.

Formats and Track Listings
7" 
 “Lose It” (2:34)
 “Caught by the Fuzz” (Acoustic) (2:28)

Music Videos
The video for “Lose It” is featured exclusively in the extras section on the Supergrass Is 10 DVD.

Other Music Videos
As well as there being a music video for “Lose It”, there was a video for the acoustic version of Caught by the Fuzz. This was filmed in the same fashion as the original “Caught by the Fuzz” music video except using different footage and with the addition of some scenes of Morris Dancers.

References

1995 singles
Supergrass songs